Marianne Clementine Håheim (born 21 August 1987) is a Norwegian author. In 2017, she won the Norwegian Booksellers Association's author award Bjørnsonstipendet, in collaboration with the Norwegian Authors' Union.

A native of Jølster, Sogn og Fjordane, Håheim made her debut with the poetry collection Bilydar, released in 2012. Her first novel, Svart belte, was published in October 2015. The novel won her the 2017 Bjørnsonstipendet.

References

1987 births
Living people
21st-century Norwegian novelists
21st-century Norwegian poets
Norwegian women novelists
Norwegian women poets
People from Jølster
21st-century Norwegian women writers